Darragh O'Brien (born 8 July 1974) is an Irish Fianna Fáil politician who has served as Minister for Housing, Local Government and Heritage since June 2020. He has been a Teachta Dála (TD) for the Dublin Fingal constituency since the 2016 general election, and previously from 2007 to 2011 for the Dublin North constituency. He previously served as a Senator for the Labour Panel from 2011 to 2016.

His brother Eoghan O'Brien is a Fingal County Councillor, representing the Howth-Malahide local electoral area.

Personal life
He was born and raised in Malahide, County Dublin, where he is an active member of St. Sylvesters GAA club, Malahide United F.C. and Malahide Rugby Club. As a child, O'Brien attended Pope John Paul II National Catholic School and then Malahide Community School (Pobalscoil Íosa). He is one of six children.

Before entering politics, he worked in the Pensions sector with Friends First Assurance Company. He lives in Malahide with his wife and daughter.

Political career
He was co-opted to a seat on Fingal County Council in March 2004. He was then elected to Fingal County Council on his own right at the 2004 local elections.

O'Brien was first elected to Dáil Éireann at the 2007 general election. He was vice-chair of Public Accounts committee, Convenor on Joint Committee on Foreign Affairs during the 30th Dáil. He was also a member of Select Committee on Justice, Equality, Defence and Women's Rights.

O'Brien was appointed to the Fianna Fáil frontbench as Spokesperson for Sport in January 2011.

He lost his seat in the 2011 general election, being deemed not elected on the 7th and final count.

He was nominated by the Taoiseach Brian Cowen to the 23rd Seanad on 3 March 2011. He was elected to the 24th Seanad as a Senator for the Labour Panel in April 2011.

He was the Fianna Fáil Seanad leader and Spokesperson on Finance from 2011 to 2016.

He returned to the Dáil at the general election in February 2016, winning a seat in the new Dublin Fingal constituency. He was the Fianna Fáil Spokesperson on Housing, Planning and Local Government until his appointment as Minister for Housing, Local Government and Heritage in June 2020.

O'Brien was re-elected at the general election in February 2020. As part of the coalition government, O'Brien was appointed Minister for Housing, Local Government and Heritage by Taoiseach Micheál Martin on 27 June 2020. 
In his time as Minister for Housing, O’Brien presided over what has been described as the worst housing crisis in over 40 years, by Fr. Peter McVerry of the Peter McVerry trust, a national housing and homeless charity committed to reducing homelessness and the harm caused by substance misuse and social disadvantage.

After a motion of no confidence against O'Brien four days prior, which was defeated, he was re-appointed to the same position following Leo Varadkar's appointment as Taoiseach on 17 December 2022.

References

External links

Darragh O'Brien's page on the Fianna Fáil website

1974 births
Living people
Fianna Fáil TDs
Local councillors in Fingal
Members of the 23rd Seanad
Members of the 24th Seanad
Members of the 30th Dáil
Members of the 32nd Dáil
Members of the 33rd Dáil
Nominated members of Seanad Éireann
Fianna Fáil senators
People from Malahide
Alumni of Institute of Technology, Carlow